Robert Francis Bell (born January 25, 1948) is a former American football defensive lineman in the National Football League for the Detroit Lions and the St. Louis Cardinals.  He played college football at the University of Cincinnati.  He played eight years in the NFL from 1971 to 1978.

References

External links
 NFL.com player page

1948 births
Living people
American football defensive ends
American football defensive tackles
Cincinnati Bearcats football players
Detroit Lions players
St. Louis Cardinals (football) players
Players of American football from Philadelphia